Toporikha is a rural locality (a village) in Pogorelovskoye Rural Settlement, Totemsky District, Vologda Oblast, Russia. The population was 22 as of 2002. There are 6 streets.

Geography 
Toporikha is located 58 km southwest of Totma (the district's administrative centre) by road. Svetitsa is the nearest rural locality.

References 

Rural localities in Tarnogsky District